Neno Mirchev (born 9 September 1909, date of death unknown) was a Bulgarian gymnast. He competed in eight events at the 1936 Summer Olympics.

References

External links
 

1909 births
Year of death missing
Bulgarian male artistic gymnasts
Olympic gymnasts of Bulgaria
Gymnasts at the 1936 Summer Olympics
Place of birth missing